Itay Goldfaden (born 24 April 1996) is an Israeli swimmer.

Career
He represented Israel at the 2020 Summer Olympics. The swimmer made his way to the finals of the mixed 4×100 meter medley relay race at the Tokyo Games.

Career highlights

Personal life
Goldfaden attended the University of South Carolina.

References

External links
 
 South Carolina Gamecocks bio

Living people
1996 births
Israeli male swimmers
Olympic swimmers of Israel
Swimmers at the 2020 Summer Olympics
South Carolina Gamecocks men's swimmers